The Pledge; Or, Castilian Honour is an 1831 tragedy by the British writer James Kenney. It premiered at the Theatre Royal, Drury Lane in London on 8 April 1831. It is inspired by the play Hernani by French writer Victor Hugo. The original London cast included William Macready as Don Leo, Henry John Wallack as Hernani, John Cooper as Don Carlos and George Yarnold as Don Ricardo.

References

Bibliography
 France, Peter & Haynes, Kenneth. The Oxford History of Literary Translation in English:: Volume 4: 1790-1900. Oxford University Press, 2006.
 Nicoll, Allardyce. A History of Early Nineteenth Century Drama 1800-1850. Cambridge University Press, 1930.

1831 plays
West End plays
British plays
Tragedy plays
Plays set in Spain
Plays by James Kenney